56 athletes (49 men and 7 women) from Argentina competed at the 1996 Summer Paralympics in Atlanta, United States.

Medallists

See also
Argentina at the Paralympics
Argentina at the 1996 Summer Olympics

References 

Nations at the 1996 Summer Paralympics
1996
1996 in Argentine sport